is a Japanese voice actor who is affiliated with Troubadour Musique Office.

Voice roles

Anime television
Hunter X Hunter (Sedokan)
Mahoromatic (Yoshihiko Gunji, Kanzaki)
Shura no Toki (Sakamoto Ryōma)
Tenchi Universe (Sagami)
Brave Police J-Decker (Makoto Onoue)

OVA
SD Gundam Gaiden (Knight Nyuu)

Anime films
Mobile Suit Gundam F91 (Chris)

Video games
Brave Saga 2 (Shizuma)

External links

Living people
Japanese male voice actors
1964 births